Mesolia meyi is a moth in the family Crambidae. It was described by Graziano Bassi in 2013. It is found in Botswana and Namibia.

References

Ancylolomiini
Moths described in 2013